Northern Bay is a small community on the northern tip of Conception Bay on the Bay de Verde Peninsula, Subdivision 1G, Newfoundland and Labrador, Canada.

Location

Northern Bay has roughly 290 permanent residents  and is located between the neighbouring communities of Gull Island and Ochre Pit Cove on Route 70. It stretches from what is sometimes referred to as the "south side" of Northern Bay where the beach is located to what was once called the "Lower Rooms" which includes the former community of Long Beach.

History
Fishing firms from England and Wales arrived at what is now Northern Bay as early as the mid-18th century. By 1768, immigrants from England and Ireland had settled the "North Shore" of Conception Bay, including Northern Bay. 

On September 17, 1775, a ship carrying 400 passengers crashed somewhere near present-day Northern Bay.  The crash was undoubtedly the result of the Newfoundland Hurricane of 1775 which remains one of the worst - if not the worst - natural disasters to have hit Newfoundland and Labrador in history.

In 1836, a Roman Catholic church (Corpus Christi Parish) was established in Northern Bay. A United Church also exists in the community. The town has three cemeteries.

One of the communities first settlers was William Hogan, an Irish merchant.

Since the 19th century, Northern Bay's population has remained relatively constant with some out-migration but a steady birthrate. The economy was mostly based on fishing and subsistence agriculture throughout the 19th and early 20th century.

A horse named after the area took part in the 1987 English Grand National Steeplechase, finishing the race in ninth place

Folklore
Myths, legends and folklore were once very important in rural Newfoundland, but today are little more than entertainment.

One folk tale that continues in the culture of Northern Bay and the surrounding communities is that of "Hannah's Tolt". The following is from the old Newfoundland magazine Decks Wash (V.9, No.6, Dec.1980):
"The local word for a rocky hill is 'tolt' and there is an interesting story surrounding the origin of Hannah's Tolt, located inland from Northern Bay near Welsh's Pond. It occurred probably in the 1920s [or] 1930s. Late in the fall of the year when a crowd of women were in the woods berry-picking, Hannah Milley and her daughter must have been separated from the main group of women when a snowstorm suddenly broke out. They never made it back to the community. Search parties failed to turn up the bodies, but about 17 years later, a man named Lewis Crummey was in the woods partridge hunting and he found the two bodies and their rusted berry buckets down at the base of a tolt, which was then nicknamed Hannah's Tolt."

Economy and society today

Demographics
The population of the community in 1836 was 282.  Present day figures do not deviate from that, although it is actually more difficult to have a reliable figure for the population of Northern Bay or any other town in rural Newfoundland today due to much outmigration and seasonal work outside the province resulting in unpredictable levels of return.

Economy
The local economy is based on fishing, fish and crab processing plants in nearby communities, some local small businesses, and Northern Bay Sands which was a provincial park until privatization in 1997. Unemployment is high however due to the cod moratorium of 1992.

Education
Until recently, Northern Bay had one school which served all the neighbouring communities from Caplin Cove through Kingston. Corpus Christi Elementary and High School in Northern Bay catered predominantly to Roman Catholic Students in the area and Jackson Walsh Elementary and High School in nearby Western Bay was an interfaith school. The referendum of 1997 which put an end to denominational education in Newfoundland and Labrador's public schools meant that the school in Northern Bay (which was renamed North Shore Collegiate) became the high school for all students in the area, and Jackson Walsh (renamed Cabot Academy) would become the elementary school serving the area.

In 2002, North Shore Collegiate closed as a result of a declining student population. The closing of the high school meant that all students from grades 7 through 12 from Northern Bay and the surrounding communities would have to attend school in either Old Perlican to the north or Carbonear further south.

The closing of the school has left an indelible impression on local life, particularly as it was also a centre for community gatherings and a symbol of growth and autonomy for not only Northern Bay but the entire North Shore region.

Tourism
The community is a popular site for tourists in the summer season due to Northern Bay Sands. This park and campgrounds is also the site of the annual "Beach Fest", a day-long concert featuring local and provincial musical acts. The close proximity to major centres on the Avalon Peninsula such as St. John's, Carbonear, and Bay Roberts has made Northern Bay a particularly well-known summer get-away spot. As a result of this, there is a renewed interest in cabin ownership in the area and real estate values have modestly increased in recent years.

Politics
The community is not incorporated as a municipality but its citizens are active in local organizations such as school boards, church groups or the North Shore Regional Fire Department.

Northern Bay is in the provincial riding of Carbonear-Trinity-Bay de Verde, represented by Liberal MHA Steve Crocker and the federal electoral district of Avalon represented by Liberal MP Ken McDonald.

Towns and communities nearby
Job's Cove
Burnt Point
Gull Island
Ochre Pit Cove
Western Bay

See also
Avalon Peninsula
List of communities in Newfoundland and Labrador
Northern Bay Sands

External links
Northern Bay Sands - Official site
Corpus Christi Parish in Northern Bay - Diocese of Grand Falls
Baccalieu Trail Community Profiles: Northern Bay (aroundthebay.ca)
A History of Northern Bay, written by Mary Elizabeth McCarthy (1964)
Community Accounts (search for "Northern Bay")
Historical Baccalieu Trail: Northern Bay

Populated coastal places in Canada
Populated places in Newfoundland and Labrador